Khin Yu May (23 March 1937 – 23 January 2014) was a two-time Myanmar Academy Award winning actress and singer.

Biography
She was born on 23 March 1937 in Yangon, Myanmar, daughter of U Yu Swan and Daw Kyin Myaing. Her sister, Khin Yu Swe, is a singer. In 1953, she began her recording career with the song May Pan Chi written by Myo Ma Thi. In 1958, she crossed over to films with a role in A-Thet by famous director Chin Sein, and I Bawa We, directed by Po Par Gyi. The Three B Company signed her to do three films, and selected her to star in the film Bo Mya Din. She won two Myanmar Academy Awards in her career: in Ko Paing Myitta in 1961 and Shwe Chi Ngwe Chi Tan Ba Lo in 1975. 

She died on 23 January 2014 at the age of 76 in Yangon and cremated at Yayway Cemetery.

Filmography
 A Thet (1958)
 I Bawa We (1958)
 Bo Mya Din
 Ko Paing Myitta (1961)
 Shwe Chi Ngwe Chi Tan Ba Lo (1975)
 Pale Myetyay
 Pan Dway Ne Way
 Hmwe Lunn thee Pan
 Chit A Mhya
 Tacha Gaba Ga Chit-Thu Ye
 Pon Pama
 Hlaing Hteit-hta Ne Kyan Taing Aung

Discography
 Yaing De Zinyaw
 Myie Lae Lay Nae Kaw
 Thet-Hsaing Thu Go
 Sakar Tekkatho

References

1937 births
2014 deaths
Burmese film actresses
20th-century Burmese women singers
20th-century Burmese actresses